Inverie Bay is a coastal embayment, on a chord of 2.12 miles, on a 207° orientation, on the northwestern coast of the sea loch in Loch Nevis, and is next to the village that takes its name, Inverie, within the Knoydart peninsula.

Geography
Glen Meadail is clearly visible from Inverie Bay, on the right side of the bay.

References

Bays of Lochaber
Bays of Scotland